Elgersburg is a municipality situated in the district of Ilm-Kreis, Thuringia, Germany.

References

Municipalities in Thuringia
Ilm-Kreis